de Venecia is a surname. Notable people with the surname include:

Christopher de Venecia (born 1986), Filipino politician
Gina de Venecia (born 1949), Filipino politician
Joey de Venecia (born 1963), Filipino politician, son of Jose
Jose de Venecia Jr. (born 1936), Filipino politician

See also
Venecia (disambiguation)